Murilo Benício Ribeiro (born 13 July 1971) is a Brazilian actor. He is perhaps most famous for his roles in the telenovelas: O Clone, América, Por Amor, A Favorita and Avenida Brasil. In the early 1990s, he began his career in the telenovela Fera Ferida, in a recurring role portraying Fabrício. Benicío's major breakthrough role was in the critically acclaimed telenovela O Clone that aired between 2001 and 2002, gaining international recognition with his co-star Giovanna Antonelli and the show's creator Glória Perez.

Since then, Benício has received critical acclaim for his work in a wide range of television and film genres. Benício's subsequent telenovelas and television series include, Chocolate com Pimenta (2004), a novela created by Walcyr Carrasco, together with Mariana Ximenes, América (2005) together with Deborah Secco, Pé na Jaca (2007), A Favorita (2008), Ti Ti Ti, the successful Avenida Brasil (2012), and the technology themed telenovela Geração Brasil (2014).

He is also the recipient of awards such as the Prêmio Arte Qualidade Brasil, the Troféu Imprensa, the Prêmio Extra de Televisão, and the Prêmio Quem de Televisão.

Career 
Benicio's television roles include the popular telenovelas O Clone and América, both which have aired in his native Brazil, the United States, Russia and in various countries in Latin America, Europe, and Asia. He has also starred in O Homem do Ano (2003) (Man of the Year).

Personal life
Benício was born in Niteroi. As a teenager he liked to surf with friends on the beaches of Rio and Niterói, but stopped after starting work as an actor. He is quoted as saying that Charlie Chaplin inspired him as a young boy to be an actor. His favorite author is Miguel de Cervantes. He stated that as a youth he liked to smoke marijuana with all of his friends and never saw anything wrong with that, despite having stopped to become an actor. He started smoking cigarettes at age 26 and after more than ten years of smoking, he quit the habit. He says he does not drink excessively and, after many years, he returned to do physical exercises.

In 1996 he began dating actress Alessandra Negrini. They moved in together and had a son, actor Antônio Benício, born in the same year. The marriage ended in 1999 due to constant disagreements, and before the child turned 1 year old.

In 1997 he met Carolina Ferraz in the telenovela Por Amor, and they became friends. At the time they met, Ferraz was married, but in 1999 she already separated so they started dating. They lived together but the relationship ended in 2001, when Carolina broke up with him because of excessive jealousy from Benício. In the same year of 2001, he met Giovanna Antonelli. They started dating in 2002 and a few months later they were living together. In 2004 they separated for a few months, but they reconciled and had a son, Pietro, born in 2005. In the same year, they separated because of irreconcilable differences. 

In October 2012 Benicio admitted he was in a relationship with actress Débora Falabella. After a long time of speculation, the two decided to take courtship. According to the actor, the couple kept the relationship under wraps during the recording of the telenovela Avenida Brasil, who had already separated from their ex recently.

Filmography

Television

Film

Theatre

Awards and nominations

References

External links 

 

1971 births
Living people
People from Niterói
Brazilian male film actors
Brazilian male television actors
Brazilian male telenovela actors